The 1998 Players Championship was a golf tournament in Florida on the PGA Tour, held  at TPC Sawgrass in Ponte Vedra Beach, southeast of Jacksonville. It was the 25th Players Championship. 

Five strokes back, Justin Leonard shot a final round 67 to win at 278 (−10), two ahead of runners-up Glen Day and Tom Lehman. Len Mattiace surged into the lead in the final round, but a quintuple-bogey at 17 ended his chances; he birdied the last hole and finished four strokes back. Third round leader and 1995 champion Lee Janzen shot 79 and fell to eighteenth. He regrouped and won his second U.S. Open at Olympic in June.

Defending champion Steve Elkington withdrew on Monday night, citing complications after sinus surgery. the first not to compete since Jerry Pate in 1983 (neck).

Venue

Eligibility requirements 
All winners of PGA Tour events awarding official money and official victory status in the preceding 12 months, concluding with the Bay Hill Invitational and dating from the 1997 Players Championship
The top 125 PGA Tour players from the final 1997 Official Money List
Winners in the last 10 calendar years of The Players Championship, Masters Tournament, U.S. Open, PGA Championship, and NEC World Series of Golf
British Open winners since 1990
Up to eight players, not otherwise eligible, designated by The Players Championship Committee as "special selections"
Any players, not otherwise eligible, who are among the top 10 money winners from the 1998 Official Money List through the Bay Hill Invitational
To complete a field of 144 players, those players in order, not otherwise eligible, from the 1998 Official Money List through the Bay Hill Invitational

Source:

Field
John Adams, Fulton Allem, Stephen Ames, Billy Andrade, Stuart Appleby, Tommy Armour III, Paul Azinger, Doug Barron, Ronnie Black, Phil Blackmar, Jay Don Blake, Guy Boros, Michael Bradley, Mike Brisky, Mark Brooks, Billy Ray Brown, Olin Browne, Tom Byrum, Mark Calcavecchia, Jim Carter, Brandel Chamblee, Michael Christie, Stewart Cink, Darren Clarke, Lennie Clements, Russ Cochran, John Cook, Fred Couples, Ben Crenshaw, John Daly, Robert Damron, Glen Day, Trevor Dodds, Joe Durant, David Duval, David Edwards, Ernie Els, Bob Estes, Brad Fabel, Nick Faldo, Brad Faxon, Rick Fehr, Dan Forsman, David Frost, Fred Funk, Jim Furyk, Robert Gamez, Brent Geiberger, Kelly Gibson, Retief Goosen, Paul Goydos, Wayne Grady, Scott Gump, Jay Haas, Donnie Hammond, Dudley Hart, Nolan Henke, Brian Henninger, Tim Herron, Gabriel Hjertstedt, Scott Hoch, P. H. Horgan III, Mike Hulbert, John Huston, Lee Janzen, Per-Ulrik Johansson, Steve Jones, Pete Jordan, Jerry Kelly, Skip Kendall, Tom Kite, Neal Lancaster, Bernhard Langer, Tom Lehman, Justin Leonard, Frank Lickliter, Bruce Lietzke, Davis Love III, Steve Lowery, Sandy Lyle, Andrew Magee, Jeff Maggert, Doug Martin, Shigeki Maruyama, Len Mattiace, Billy Mayfair, Scott McCarron, Mark McCumber, Rocco Mediate, Phil Mickelson, Larry Mize, Colin Montgomerie, Larry Nelson, Frank Nobilo, Mark O'Meara, David Ogrin, José María Olazábal, Masashi Ozaki, Naomichi Ozaki, Jesper Parnevik, Craig Parry, Steve Pate, Corey Pavin, Chris Perry, Kenny Perry, Don Pooley, Nick Price, Tom Purtzer, Mike Reid, Larry Rinker, Lee Rinker, Loren Roberts, Costantino Rocca, Clarence Rose, Scott Simpson, Joey Sindelar, Vijay Singh, Jeff Sluman, Mike Springer, Craig Stadler, Mike Standly, Paul Stankowski, Payne Stewart, Curtis Strange, Steve Stricker, David Sutherland, Kevin Sutherland, Hal Sutton, Phil Tataurangi, Tommy Tolles, David Toms, Kirk Triplett, Ted Tryba, Bob Tway, Omar Uresti, Scott Verplank, Grant Waite, Duffy Waldorf, Tom Watson, Lee Westwood, Mark Wiebe, Willie Wood, Tiger Woods, Ian Woosnam

 Steve Elkington, the 1991 and 1997 champion, withdrew due to complications after sinus surgery; the first defending champion not to compete since Jerry Pate in 1983.
 Greg Norman, the 1994 champion, withdrew prior to the first round with a shoulder injury.

Round summaries

First round
Thursday, March 26, 1998

Source:

Second round
Friday, March 27, 1998

Source:

Third round
Saturday, March 28, 1998

Source:

Final round
Sunday, March 29, 1998

References

External links
The Players Championship website

1998
1998 in golf
1998 in American sports
1998 in sports in Florida
March 1998 sports events in the United States